Bolitoglossa ramosi is a species of salamander in the family Plethodontidae.
It is endemic to Colombia.

Its natural habitats are subtropical or tropical moist montane forests, arable land, pastureland, rural gardens, and urban areas.

References

Bolitoglossa
Amphibians of Colombia
Endemic fauna of Colombia
Taxonomy articles created by Polbot
Amphibians described in 1972